Acleris fuscopunctata is a species of moth of the family Tortricidae. It is found in China (Fujien).

References

Moths described in 1987
fuscopunctata
Moths of Asia